In common law, surrender is the term describing a situation where a tenant gives up possession of property held under a tenancy as a result of which the tenancy ends.

A surrender differs from an eviction on the question of mutual agreement. Surrender implies a mutual agreement, whereas eviction implies the absence of a mutual agreement.

References

Property law